The Canadian Beef Grading Agency is an organization accredited by the Canadian Food Inspection Agency to monitor grading of meat products in Canada.

References

Food and drink in Canada
Agriculture in Canada
1929 establishments in Canada
Meat processing in Canada
Agricultural organizations based in Canada
Meat industry organizations